The 14209/14210 Lucknow Vindhyachal Intercity Express is a Express train belonging to Indian Railways that runs between Lucknow and Vindhyachal in India.

Coaches

The 14209/14210 Lucknow Vindhyachal Intercity Express presently has 1 AC Chair Car, 9 General Second Class and 2 General Unreserved coaches.

As is customary with Indian Railways, coaches are added/removed as per the demand.

Service

The 14209/14210 Lucknow Vindhyachal Intercity Express covers the distance of 284 kilometres in 5 hours 40 mins as 14209 Vindhyachal Lucknow Intercity Express (50.12 km/hr) & 5 hours 45 mins as 14210 Lucknow Vindhyachal Intercity Express (49.39 km/hr).
 
It reverses direction at Allahabad Junction.

Traction

It is a total diesel haul train. A Lucknow based WDM 3A hauls the train in both directions.

Time Table

14210 Lucknow Vindhyachal Intercity Express leaves Lucknow Charbagh on a daily basis at 07:30 hrs IST and reaches Vindhyachal at 13:15 hrs IST.

On return, 14209 Vindhyachal Lucknow Intercity Express leaves Vindhyachal on a daily basis at 13:45 hrs IST and reaches Lucknow Charbagh at 19:25 hrs IST.

External links
 [www.indianrail.gov.in]

References 

Passenger trains originating from Lucknow
Intercity Express (Indian Railways) trains